Gillam station is a station stop in Gillam, Manitoba, Canada.  The stop is served by Via Rail's Winnipeg – Churchill train.

The -storey, wood-frame building was built in 1930 by the Canadian National Railway  as a Class II station building.
The station building was designated a national heritage railway station in 1992.

See also

 List of designated heritage railway stations of Canada

Footnotes

External links 
Via Rail Station Information
Government of Manitoba Regional Map 

Via Rail stations in Manitoba
Designated Heritage Railway Stations in Manitoba
Canadian Register of Historic Places in Manitoba
Railway stations in Canada opened in 1930
1930 establishments in Manitoba